Vladimir Balić (born 29 September 1970) was a Croatian football goalkeeper who last played for Hajduk Split.

Club career
Balić played for Vukovar '91, Osijek and Zadar before joining Hajduk Split.

He was sporting director of HNK Cibalia in 2017 and 2018.

References

External links
Short biography: Vladimir Balić - a man from Vinkovci
Vladimir Balić profile at Nogometni Magazin 
Vladimir Balić at Euronews

1970 births
Living people
Sportspeople from Vinkovci
Association football goalkeepers
Croatian footballers
HNK Vukovar '91 players
HNK Hajduk Split players
NK Osijek players
NK Zadar players
Croatian Football League players